Caroline Cochrane (born December 5, 1960) is a Canadian politician, who is the 13th and current premier of the Northwest Territories. She is one of three currently serving female premiers in Canada and the second female premier of the Northwest Territories after Nellie Cournoyea, who served from 1991 to 1995.

She was formerly known as Caroline Cochrane-Johnson.

Life and career 
Cochrane was born in Flin Flon, Manitoba, in 1960 and moved with her family to Yellowknife in 1963, where she grew up. She received a bachelor’s degree in social work	from the University College of the Cariboo (now known as Thompson Rivers University) in Kamloops, British Columbia, in 1999. She was first elected to the Legislative Assembly of the Northwest Territories in the 2015 election, representing the electoral district of Range Lake.

Prior to her election to the legislature, Cochrane was CEO of the Centre for Northern Families, a social-service agency administered by the Yellowknife Women's Society in Yellowknife.

In October 2019, Cochrane defeated three other candidates after three rounds of secret-ballot votes and was elected Premier of the Northwest Territories.

References 

1960 births
Living people
Canadian female first ministers
Canadian Métis people
Members of the Executive Council of the Northwest Territories
Members of the Legislative Assembly of the Northwest Territories
People from Flin Flon
Premiers of the Northwest Territories
Women government ministers of Canada
Women MLAs in the Northwest Territories
21st-century Canadian women politicians
Female heads of government